"Hook Up" is a collaborative single by the artists signed under New Zealand record label Dawn Raid Entertainment under the name Dawn Raid All-Stars released in 2004.

The premise of the single was also to promote Boost Mobile and has been used as the background music for their advertisements.

Track listing
"Hook Up"
"Hook Up" (Instrumental)
"Hook Up" (Video)

Charts

2004 singles
Dawn Raid All-Stars songs
2004 songs
Song articles with missing songwriters